The Central Cemetery (Spanish: Cementerio central) of Barrio Sur, Montevideo, is one of the main cemeteries in Uruguay. It also ranks amongst the most popular in the country, given that most famous Uruguayan people are buried there.

It is located in the southern area of the city and it was founded in 1835. The entrance, designed and built up after the Uruguayan Civil War (1839–1852), is the work of the Italian sculptor Bernardo Poncini.

The cemetery was originally placed far away from the city, mainly because of the persistent risk of an epidemic. However, with the fast development and growth of Montevideo throughout the 20th century, the Central Cemetery is now surrounded by the metropolis.

It became quite popular after 1858. It was one of the first cemeteries in the country at a time when burials were still carried out by the Catholic Church. Some works and statues made by José Belloni and José Luis Zorrilla de San Martín can be found in the cemetery.

Notable interments 
Among those interred there are:
 Eduardo Acevedo
 Mario Benedetti
 Delmira Agustini
 Jorge Batlle
 Luis Batlle Berres
 José Batlle y Ordóñez
 Juan Manuel Blanes
 Zelmar Michelini
 Luis Alberto de Herrera
 Benito Nardone
 José Enrique Rodó
 Juan Zorrilla de San Martín

References

External links 

 Central Cemetery – data
 Tour across the Central Cemetery – IMM 
 Visiting the Central Cemetery, Viajando Por Uruguay

1835 establishments in Uruguay
Barrio Sur, Montevideo
Burials at the Central Cemetery of Montevideo
Cemeteries in Montevideo